Norwogonin, also known as 5,7,8-trihydroxyflavone (5,7,8-THF), is a flavone, a naturally occurring flavonoid-like chemical compound which is found in Scutellaria baicalensis (Baikal skullcap). It has been found to act as an agonist of the TrkB, the main signaling receptor of brain-derived neurotrophic factor (BDNF), and appears to possess roughly the same activity in this regard to that of the closely related but more well-known tropoflavin (7,8-DHF).

See also 
 Tropomyosin receptor kinase B § Agonists

References 

Flavones
TrkB agonists